Ore (Japanese: 俺) is the commercial debut album of Japanese ska band, Oreskaband, released on July 19, 2006.

Track listing
 Pantime
 花のスカダンス (Ska Dance Flower)
 ピノキオ (Pinocchio)
 ナイフとフォーク (Knife and fork)
 Monkey Man (Monkey Monkey Man) (Loose cover of Monkey Man by the Toots & the Maytals)
 少年S (Boys S)

2006 albums
Oreskaband albums

ja:オレスカバンド